Jury Govt Model High School is a secondary school in Juri town, Juri Upazila, Moulvibazar District, Sylhet Division, Bangladesh. It was  established in 1930. Classes are from 6 to 10. The total number of students is about 2200. Teaching staff is about 36. Sitangshu Shekar Das is Headmaster.

See also 
 Education in Bangladesh

References 

Educational institutions established in 1994
High schools in Bangladesh
1994 establishments in Bangladesh
Schools in Moulvibazar District
Juri Upazila